Özge Kavurmacıoğlu (born 7 March 1993 in İzmit, Turkey) is a Turkish female basketball player. The young national plays for Fenerbahçe as both small and power forward position. Özge is 187 cm tall and weighs 77 kg. She was playing for Fenerbahçe Istanbul since 2006 in youth level and since 2010 in senior level. She was loaned to Beşiktaş in 2012.

Honors

Club
Turkish Championship (2): 2010-11, 2011–12
Turkish Presidents Cup (1): 2010

National
 2012 FIBA Europe Under-20 Championship for Women - 
 2013 FIBA Europe Under-20 Championship for Women -

See also
 Turkish women in sports

References

External links
Player Profile at bjk.com.tr
Player Profile at fibaeurope.com

1993 births
Living people
Antakya Belediyespor players
Beşiktaş women's basketball players
Galatasaray S.K. (women's basketball) players
Turkish women's basketball players
Forwards (basketball)
20th-century Turkish sportswomen
21st-century Turkish sportswomen